Brian Habib (born December 2, 1964) is a former professional American football player who played offensive lineman for 11 seasons for the Minnesota Vikings, Denver Broncos, and Seattle Seahawks. With the Broncos, he won Super Bowl XXXII, beating the Green Bay Packers.

Habib currently is an offensive line coach for Del Norte High School in Poway, California.  He also works as a real estate agent serving the Poway, Rancho Bernardo, and 4S Ranch neighborhoods of San Diego, California.

1964 births
Living people
People from Ellensburg, Washington
Players of American football from Washington (state)
American football offensive linemen
Minnesota Vikings players
Denver Broncos players
Seattle Seahawks players
Washington Huskies football players
Ed Block Courage Award recipients